Volker Deckardt (born 9 March 1944) is an Austrian former swimmer. He competed in the men's 200 metre butterfly at the 1964 Summer Olympics.

References

External links
 

1944 births
Living people
Olympic swimmers of Austria
Swimmers at the 1964 Summer Olympics
Place of birth missing (living people)
Austrian male butterfly swimmers
20th-century Austrian people
21st-century Austrian people